Elaeus is an ancient city of Thrace, now in Turkey.

Elaeus or Elaious may also refer to:

Elaeus (Aetolia), a town of ancient Aetolia, Greece
Elaeus (Argolis), a town of ancient Argolis, Greece
Elaeus (Attica), a deme of ancient Attica, Greece
Elaeus (Bithynia), a town of ancient Bithynia, in Asia Minor
Elaeus (Caria), a town of ancient Caria, in Asia Minor
Elaeus (Epirus), a town of ancient Epirus, Greece
Elaeus (Naxos), a town of ancient Naxos, Greece